Michael John Lema (born 3 April 1999) is a professional footballer who plays as a right or left midfielder for Austrian club Lafnitz. Born in Tanzania, Lema was a youth international for Austria.

Club career
On 21 March 2018, Lema signed his first professional contract with SK Sturm Graz. Lema made his professional debut for Sturm Graz in a 0–0 Austrian Football Bundesliga tie with SC Rheindorf Altach on 27 May 2018. In December 2019 it was confirmed, that Lema would join TSV Hartberg on loan from January 2020 until the end of the season.

At the end of the 2020–21 season, he moved to Hartberg on a permanent basis.

On 8 February 2022, Lema signed with Lafnitz.

International career
Lema was born in Tanzania, and in 2008 was sponsored to move to Austria. He is a youth international for Austria, but has expressed an interest in representing the Tanzania national football team.

References

External links
 
 OEFB Profile
 Austrian Bundesliga Profile

1999 births
Living people
People from Singida Region
Tanzanian emigrants to Austria
Naturalised citizens of Austria
Austrian footballers
Austria youth international footballers
Tanzanian footballers
Austrian people of Tanzanian descent
Austrian Football Bundesliga players
SK Sturm Graz players
TSV Hartberg players
SV Lafnitz players
2. Liga (Austria) players
Association football midfielders